Polystachya cooperi is a species of flowering plant in the orchid family, Orchidaceae. It is native to Cameroon and Nigeria. It grows in forests and woodlands. Most populations are threatened with habitat loss as forests are cleared.

References

cooperi
Orchids of Cameroon
Orchids of Nigeria
Endangered plants
Taxonomy articles created by Polbot